Elżbieta Romanowska (born 4 June 1983 in Głogów, Poland) is a Polish film, television and theater actress. A graduate of the Ludwik Solski Academy for the Dramatic Arts in Wrocław, she is best known for the Polish TV series Ranczo (Ranch) and 2XL.

In 2008 she participated in the 4th edition of the show Jak oni śpiewają (How They Sing), taking 6th place.

Selected filmography 
 2007: Na Wspólnej as Pamela
 2007: Na dobre i na złe as Basia Osiak
 2008–2016: Ranczo (Ranch) as shopkeeper Jola
 2009: M jak miłość (L for Love) as pregnant Bogusia
 2009: BrzydUla as Aldona Turek, sister of Adam
 2010: Ciacho as nurse
 2010: Licencja na wychowanie as Kasia
 2011:  as Krystian's wife
 2011: 1920 Bitwa warszawska as milkmaid
 2012: Ja to mam szczęście as Paula, Tadeusz's girl
 2012: Prawo Agaty as Maja Lipiec, friend of Iwona (ep. 12)
 2013–present: 2XL as Agata Dec
 2014–present: Słodkie życie (Sweet Life) as Klara

References

External links 

Official profile in Filmpolski.pl database

1983 births
Polish film actresses
Polish television actresses
People from Głogów
Polish stage actresses
20th-century Polish actresses
Living people